The Military ranks of Antigua and Barbuda are the military insignia used by the Antigua and Barbuda Defence Force. Being a member of the Commonwealth of Nations, Antigua and Barbuda shares a rank structure similar to that of the United Kingdom.

Commissioned Officers
The rank insignia for commissioned officers for the army and coast guard respectively.

Enlisted
The rank insignia for enlisted personnel for the army and coast guard respectively.

References

Antigua and Barbuda
Ranks